The Arrows A3 was a Formula One car which the Arrows team used to compete in the 1980 and 1981 Formula One seasons.

After the failure of the A2 in the 1979 Formula One season, the A3 was a very conventional design. The A3 featured a short wheelbase and conventional front nose and rear wing. The only aerodynamic novelty was a gearbox enclosure to reduce drag.

The car was used in 1981, as Arrows did not have the resources to create a car with hydropneumatic suspension like the Brabham BT49C.

Complete Formula One World Championship results
(key) (results in bold indicate pole position)

References

A03